Lower Hutt City AFC is an association football club in Lower Hutt, New Zealand. They currently compete in the Central League, and act as a farm team to the Wellington Phoenix.

Club history
The club formed in 1967 with the amalgamation of two existing clubs, Lower Hutt City (formed in 1921) and Railways (formed in 1942). The club also competed under the name Hutt City during its only National League season, 1997–1998.

Staff and board members

As of 12 April 2012.

External links
Club website
Capital Football profile

Association football clubs in Wellington
Association football clubs established in 1968
Sport in Lower Hutt
1968 establishments in New Zealand